Eva Setzkorn is a retired East German slalom canoeist who competed from the mid-1950s to the early 1960s. She won seven medals at the ICF Canoe Slalom World Championships with three golds (Folding K-1 team: 1955, 1957, 1959), three silvers (Folding K-1: 1953, 1957; Folding K-1 team: 1953) and a bronze (Folding K-1: 1955).

References
Overview of athlete's results at CanoeSlalom.net

East German female canoeists
Possibly living people
Year of birth missing (living people)
Medalists at the ICF Canoe Slalom World Championships